Sudama Pandey "Dhoomil" (9 November 1936 – 10 February 1975) was an Indian poet who wrote in Hindi. He is known for his revolutionary writings and his "protest-poetry" along with Gajanan Madhav Muktibodh.

Known as the angry young man of Hindi poetry because of his rebellious writings, during his lifetime he published just one collection of poems, Sansad se Sarak Tak ("From the Parliament to the Street"), but another collection of his work entitled Kal Sunna Mujhe was released posthumously, and in 1979 went on to win the Sahitya Akademi Award in Hindi literature. 
Sudama Pandey Ka Prajatantra, in 1984.[8] and Dhoomil Samagra in 2021 (in 3 Vol.) was published by his son Dr. Ratnashankar Pandey.

Biography

Sudama Pandey "Dhoomil" was born on 9 November 1936 in Khewali, Varanasi district, Uttar Pradesh. After successfully passing out of secondary education at the tenth-grade level, he joined the Industrial Training Institute (ITI), Varanasi where he passed out with a Diploma in Electrics, and later he joined the same institution as an instructor in the Electricals Department.

He died on 10 February 1975, at the young age of 38.

In 2006 the Bharatiya Janata Party (BJP), a nationalist party, raised an objection in the Indian parliament over the inclusion of one of his radical poems "Mochiram" in the NCERT Hindi textbooks which subsequently was replaced by one of his other poems – "Ghar Main Wapsi".

The last book of Dhoomil, Sudama Pandey Ka Prajatantra, was published by his son Ratnashankar Pandey.

Works

Poetry collections
Sansad Se Sadak Tak - 1972
Kal Sunana Mujhe - 1976
Sudaama Paande Ka Prajaatantr - 1984
Dhoomil Samagra (In set of 3 Vol.) - 2021
Source:

Further reading
 The Tree of Tongues — An Anthology of Modern Indian Poetry edited by E.V. Ramakrishnan. Indian Institute of Advanced Study, Shimla.
 Unfinished Business: Five Modern Hindi Poets (Dhoomil, Shrikant Verma, Raghuvir Sahay, Kunwar Narain, Kedarnath Singh) by Vinay Dharwadker.
 "Four Hindi Poets", article by Shrikant Verma in World Literature Today, Vol. 68, 1994.
 Contemporary Literature of Asia, by Arthur W. Biddle, Gloria Bien and Vinay Dharwadker. 1996, Prentice Hall. .

References

External links
 Dhoomil at Kavita Kosh
 The City, Evening, And An Old Man: Me, by 'Dhoomil'

1936 births
1975 deaths
Hindi-language poets
Recipients of the Sahitya Akademi Award in Hindi
Writers from Varanasi
20th-century Indian poets
Indian male poets
Poets from Uttar Pradesh
20th-century Indian male writers